Dr.  Bhimrao Ambedkar International Sports Stadium, is a multipurpose stadium situated to the south of Faizabad, Uttar Pradesh, India. This stadium is a part of a multi crore project for a sports complex.

The ground is an international standard sports complex being built near the junction of the NH- 330 and the Ayodhya ring-road, a few kilometres away from Ayodhya Airport.

The new sports complex has an astro turf, synthetic track, swimming pool, cricket field, hostels and other required facilities.

Facilities

Dr. Bhimrao Ambedkar International Sports Stadium is one of the selected stadiums in Uttar Pradesh with a multi-purpose hall and an swimming pool. Other facilities offered allow people to play: Football, athletics, volleyball, hockey, basketball, badminton, cricket, handball, table tennis, taekwondo and wrestling.

Controversies 

The Lokayukta office has received a complaint from Bhanu Pratap Singh of Ayodhya - who has accused the minister of corruption in the construction the stadium.  According to the complainant, the sports minister had a nexus with former sports director Hari Om and former project manager R.D. Prasad, and had deliberately delayed the construction of the  86 crore Dr Bhim Rao Ambedkar Stadium paving the way for an escalation of costs to  150 crore.

References

Sports venues in Uttar Pradesh
Cricket grounds in Uttar Pradesh
Football venues in Uttar Pradesh
Faizabad district
Field hockey venues in India
Buildings and structures in Faizabad
2019 establishments in Uttar Pradesh
Sports venues completed in 2009